The SIU Edwardsville Cougars men's soccer team represents Southern Illinois University Edwardsville (SIUE) in the Missouri Valley Conference of NCAA Division I soccer. The Cougars play their home matches on Bob Guelker Field at Ralph Korte Stadium located in the southwest corner of the SIUE campus in Edwardsville, Illinois.

It was announced on June 2, 2017, that the Cougars' men's soccer and wrestling teams would become affiliate members of the Mid-American Conference beginning in the 2018 season. Through the cooperative efforts of the MVC and the MAC, the Cougars soccer team made the move a year earlier than originally announced and played the 2017 season in the MAC.

On November 30, 2018, it was reported that Mario Sanchez had resigned to accept the position of director of youth development and community relations for Louisville City FC of the United Soccer League. The search for a permanent replacement began immediately.  On January 18, Michigan State assistant coach Cale Wassermann was named as the Cougars' new head coach.

History

The Bob Guelker era
The SIUE soccer program first entered competition in 1967 under the leadership of National Soccer Hall of Fame coach Bob Guelker.  Guelker had been hired away from St. Louis University, where he had also started the program, winning five NCAA championships in eight seasons, including the first NCAA soccer title in 1959. The Cougars were invited to the NCAA tournament in Guelker's third year at the helm and reached the Elite 8 the next two seasons.

When the NCAA started a second division for soccer in 1972, SIUE moved into the new division, since its other athletic programs were also in Division II, and a number of other college soccer powers also made the move. That team went 11–0–3 for the season, winning the first Division II championship. (Of the 24 schools in that inaugural Division II tournament, SIUE and 7 others currently play in Division I (3 others moved into Division I in 1973 but have since moved down), 5 others would later win Division II championships, and Akron, Hartwick, and SIUE would later win Division I crowns.)

After winning the Division II title, SIUE took advantage of the NCAA rule then in effect that allowed Division II schools to play one sport in Division I and one sport in Division III, and moved to Division I. In the next ten seasons, Guelker's Cougars were invited to the Division I tournament every year, advancing to four College Cup semifinals appearances and winning the Division I title in 1979.

Toward the end of Guelker's tenure, scandal in some of the university's other sports programs brought about a major reduction of funding for all sports, and the program went into a period of decline.

Guelker headed the program until his death in February 1986.  In his nineteen seasons, only the first (3–3–0) was a non-winning one, and he compiled a record of 216–67–21, with fourteen appearances in the NCAA tournament (thirteen in Division I).

The Ed Huneke era
Coach Guelker was succeeded by former Cougar player Ed Huneke. During Huneke's years, the program moved from a Division I independent to membership in the short-lived Big Central Soccer Conference, back to being an independent, a short associate membership in the Mid-Continent Conference, and then reluctantly stepped down to join the Division II Great Lakes Valley Conference (GLVC) in 1996.

During the university's twelve years in the GLVC, Huneke's Cougars won six regular season titles, four conference tournaments, and received seven invitations to the NCAA Division II tournament, where they reached the Division II College Cup semifinals three times and were national runner-up in 2004.

Huneke coached the Cougars for twenty-two seasons, building a record of 251–155–34.

The Kevin Kalish era
From Huneke's retirement in 2008 through the 2013 season, the program was led by Kevin Kalish, who took it both back into Division I and into competition in the Missouri Valley Conference (MVC).  During the Cougars' first season (2010) in the MVC, they finished second in both the conference regular season (to Creighton) and the conference tournament (to Bradley).

In 2012, the Cougars were ranked during the season for the first time since the 1980s, finished second in the MVC in both the regular season and the conference tournament (both to NCAA semifinalist Creighton), and narrowly missed returning to the Division I tournament for the first time since 1982. For the season, Kalish was named the National Soccer Coaches Association of America (NSCAA) Midwest Region Coach of the Year, and his staff was named the Missouri Valley Conference Coaching Staff of the year.

Kalish compiled a 49–46–14 record in his six seasons.

On December 6, 2012, it was announced that Kevin Kalish was leaving for a job that would allow him to spend more time with his family.

The Interim

On December 6, 2013, Associate Head Coach Scott Donnelly was named to succeed Kevin Kalish and become SIUE's fourth head coach. For the second year in a row, Donnelly's incoming players were rated one of the top recruiting classes in the country.

On August 10, 2014, it was announced that Donnelly had suddenly and unexpectedly resigned after being recruited to be the new Technical Advisor for the Northeast region of the United States Soccer Federation (U.S. Soccer). Seventh year goalkeepers coach Brian Jones and first year assistant coach David Korn were named co-head coaches.

The Cougars started the 2014 season in frustrating fashion, with five overtime games in the first six and a record of 0–6–2 after eight games. Then they entered Missouri Valley Conference play and ran off four straight victories. An embarrassing loss at NIU was followed by a tie at nationally ranked Louisville and another tie at home to eventual MVC champion Missouri State. Completing the regular season at 5–8–2, the Cougars entered the MVC Tournament as the #2 seed and an opening round bye at Bradley. The Cougars rallied from trailing early to defeat Bradley 2–1 in the semifinals. Then, in their school record ninth overtime game of the season, the Cougars downed Missouri State 1–0 to win SIUE's first MVC Tournament Championship and earn a spot in the NCAA Division I Men's Soccer Championship for the first time since 1982 and then advanced to the second round.

Athletic Director Dr. Brad Hewitt announced on December 5 that SIUE would conduct a nationwide search for a new head coach stating, "We will secure the best possible leadership to maintain and enhance the strong academic, athletic and community engagement standards that define SIUE Soccer and SIUE Athletics.". David Korn remained as associate head coach and Scott Gyllenberg was retained as assistant coach. Brian Jones, however, departed to become the goalkeepers coach of the professional Saint Louis Football Club of the United Soccer Leagues.

The Mario Sanchez era
On January 27, 2015, Mario Sanchez, the associate head coach of the Louisville Cardinals was introduced as the new Cougars head coach.

In Sanchez' first season, the Cougars went 12–4–1 overall and 5–1–0 in the MVC, earning the first conference title since joining the league in 2010. With a Rating Percentage Index (RPI) of 39 (out of 206 teams), the Cougars were the 28th team not to receive an automatic bid to the 2015 NCAA Division I Men's Soccer Championship. Since there were only 24 at-large berths available, SIUE was passed over.

In Sanchez' second season, the Cougars won the 2016 Missouri Valley Conference Men's Soccer Tournament, the team's second title in three years, and earned the MVC's automatic bid to the 2016 NCAA Division I Men's Soccer Championship. The Cougars tied #13 Michigan State 1–1 and advanced  to the second round on penalty kicks 9–8. They tied #11 Butler 0–0 and advanced  to the third round on penalty kicks 
5–4. They finally lost at #2 Wake Forest 2–1 in the program's first Division I Sweet 16 game since 1982.

On May 9, 2017, SIUE and Saint Louis U. (SLU) verbally agreed to resume their soccer rivalry in the 2018 and 2019 seasons. The annual Bronze Boot game was once the premier rivalry game in U.S. college soccer. The 1972, 1973, and 1980 games rank as the 14th, 7th, and 1st largest crowds in NCAA soccer history. “I remember hearing about the Bronze Boot;” declared SIUE coach Mario Sanchez. “It was one of college soccer’s biggest games every year. I’m ready for it to happen again." While the annual match was once played at Busch Memorial Stadium, the 2018 game will be at SLU's Hermann Stadium, with the 2019 meeting moving to SIUE's Ralph Korte Stadium. SLU leads the series 9–26–1.

The news was released on November 30, 2018, that Mario Sanchez resigned to join the Louisville City FC as director of youth development and community relations for the United Soccer League team.

The Cale Wassermann era
On January 18, 2019, following a national search, Michigan State assistant coach Cale Wassermann was named as the Cougars' new head coach.

On June 12, 2020, a month after the MAC announced the cancellation of its men's soccer tournament, MVC Commissioner Doug Elgin and SIUE Director of Athletics Tim Hall announced that SIUE men's soccer will return to the Missouri Valley Conference beginning with the 2021 season.

Honors
NCAA Division I Championship
Winners (1): 1979
Runners Up: 1975
NCAA Division II Championship
Winners (1): 1972
Runners Up: 2004

All Americans
Through the years, more than seventy Cougars have gone on to play professionally, and twenty-eight have been named All-Americans for their play at SIUE.

Jack Blake 1970	
John Carenza 1970–71
Vince Fassi 1972
Tom Galati 1973
John Stremlau	1973 & 1975
Chris Carenza	1974
Bob Kessen	1974
Greg Makowski	1975–77
Mike Kelley	1978
Tom Groark	1981 First Team
Ed Gettemeier	1982 Third Team
Chris Hundelt	1983 Third Team
Bill Stallings	1984 Third Team
Steve Trittschuh	1985 Third Team &1986 First Team
Matt Little	1997 First Team
Justin McMillian	2001 First Team
Chris Camacho	2002 Third Team
Addae Rique	2003 First Team
Cal Thomas	2003 First Team
Tim Velten	2003 Third Team
Michael Burgund	2004 Second Team 
Mike Banner	2005 First Team
Kevin Thibodeau	2005 Second Team
John Matthews	2006 Third Team
Greg Crook	2007 Second Team
Zach Bauer	 2007 Third Team
Randy Roy	2007 Second Team
Dustin Attarian	2007 Second Team

Three Cougars have been named to the NSCAA Men's University Division Scholar All-America Teams.
Ryan Bauer, 2012, Second Team
Matt Polster. 2014. First Team
Jacob Wieser. 2015. First Team

Record by Year
Reference

Conference standings

See also
 SIU Edwardsville Cougars women's soccer
 Saint Louis–SIU Edwardsville men's soccer rivalry

References

External links